King Crimson were an English progressive rock band from London. Formed in January 1969, the group originally included bassist and vocalist Greg Lake, guitarist and keyboardist Robert Fripp, keyboardist and woodwind musician Ian McDonald, lyricist Peter Sinfield, and drummer Michael Giles. After a number of personnel changes, the group disbanded in 1974 but have since reformed on a number of occasions. As of the latest lineup change in 2020, King Crimson consisted of Fripp (the sole constant member of the band), saxophonist and flautist Mel Collins (who first joined in 1970), bassist Tony Levin (who first joined in 1981), drummers Pat Mastelotto (who first joined in 1994) and Gavin Harrison (since 2007), guitarist and vocalist Jakko Jakszyk (since 2013), and drummer and keyboardist Jeremy Stacey (since 2016).

History

1969–1984

After some initial rehearsals starting in late November 1968, King Crimson were officially formed on 13 January 1969 with a lineup of Greg Lake on bass and vocals, Robert Fripp on guitar, Ian McDonald on woodwind and keyboards, Peter Sinfield as a lyricist and occasional synthesizer player, and Michael Giles on drums. After the recording of the band's debut album In the Court of the Crimson King, McDonald and Giles left King Crimson, playing their last show on 16 December 1969. Fripp, Lake and Sinfield recorded the band's second album In the Wake of Poseidon, with Giles, his brother Peter, Mel Collins, Gordon Haskell and Keith Tippett all contributing to the sessions. Lake then departed to form Emerson, Lake & Palmer, while Fripp and Sinfield rebuilt the group after the album's release, finalising the new lineup by August with Haskell, Collins and Andy McCulloch in place of Lake, McDonald and Giles, respectively. After recording Lizard, both Haskell and McCulloch departed.

Ian Wallace replaced McCulloch in December 1970, and Raymond "Boz" Burrell took over from Haskell the following February. The group released Islands and returned to regular touring over the next year, Burrell, Collins and Wallace all left to join Alexis Korner's new group Snape in April 1972. Sinfield had left the group a few months earlier. After the release of the live album Earthbound, Fripp rebuilt King Crimson again in July 1972 with the additions of former Family bassist and vocalist John Wetton, violinist and keyboardist David Cross, former Yes drummer Bill Bruford, and percussionist Jamie Muir. After the first of two live shows scheduled upon completion of the group's new album Larks' Tongues in Aspic, Muir abruptly left King Crimson to pursue Buddhism. The remaining four-piece issued Starless and Bible Black in March 1974.

By the time the group began recording the follow-up Red in July 1974, King Crimson were a trio following Cross's departure at the end of the previous tour. Later, on 25 September, Fripp announced that King Crimson had officially disbanded, claiming that the group were "completely over for ever and ever". After several years of side projects, Fripp formed a group called Discipline in April 1981 with former King Crimson drummer Bruford, as well as vocalist and guitarist Adrian Belew, and bassist and Chapman stick player Tony Levin. By the time the band's debut album Discipline was released in October, they had adopted the King Crimson moniker. This lineup remained stable for three years, releasing follow-up albums Beat and Three of a Perfect Pair, before disbanding again upon the conclusion of a promotional touring cycle in July 1984.

1994 onwards
After a ten-year break, King Crimson reformed again in 1994, with Fripp, Belew, Levin and Bruford joined by second bassist/Chapman stick player Trey Gunn and second drummer Pat Mastelotto. This lineup, dubbed the "Double Trio", began rehearsing in April 1994 and released its only studio effort THRAK the following year. After touring extensively, the group returned to the studio in May 1997 for the recording of their twelfth studio album, but faced difficulties making progress with the sessions. Instead of disbanding again, Fripp decided to initiate a process of "fraKctalisation", splitting the six band members into four "ProjeKcts" of various lineups. Each ProjeKct performed several live shows and wrote together, serving as "research and development" units for the full King Crimson incarnation.

The ProjeKcts spawned several studio and live recordings, which were issued in 1999 as part of The ProjeKcts box set. By this time the lineup of King Crimson was a "Double Duo" consisting of Belew, Fripp, Gunn and Mastelotto, following the departures of Bruford and Levin. The band released two new studio albums, The ConstruKction of Light and The Power to Believe, before Gunn announced in November 2003 that he was leaving to explore new musical opportunities. Levin returned to take his place. Rehearsals subsequently began for planned new material, with a string of rehearsal sessions taking place in September 2004, before the group disbanded for a third time.

In June 2007, Fripp announced that a new lineup of King Crimson had been finalised for the band's 40th anniversary tour the following year. In addition to the members of the 2004 incarnation, Gavin Harrison of Porcupine Tree was added as a second drummer. The tour took place in August 2008, after which members returned to focus on other projects. In September 2013, despite claiming the previous year that he was retiring, Fripp announced another reformation of King Crimson. In addition to Levin, Mastoletto and Harrison, the eighth lineup was confirmed to include returning saxophonist and flautist Mel Collins, new guitarist and vocalist Jakko Jakszyk, and third drummer Bill Rieflin. In March 2016, Jeremy Stacey replaced Rieflin for the year's touring, becoming a full member during the winter leg of the tour. Rieflin switched over to being the band's first full-time keyboardist upon his return in January 2017.

Rieflin was temporarily replaced again for an autumn 2017 tour by Chris Gibson. For the band's 50th anniversary tour in 2019, it was announced that Rieflin would once more be temporarily replaced, this time by Theo Travis. However, after a day of rehearsal, the band opted instead to do the 2019 tour as a seven-piece.  Rieflin's parts were divided among other band members, with Jakszyk and Collins adding keyboards to their on-stage rigs, and Levin once again using the synthesizer he used during the 1980s tours. Rieflin died of cancer on March 23, 2020, reducing the line-up to a septet.

On December 8, 2021 the band played the last show of their "Music Is Our Friend" tour, after which Fripp tweeted out that the band had "Moved from sound to silence", Levin published in his blog “Tonight is the final concert of the tour, and quite possibly the final King Crimson concert.". No announcements have been heard from the band since December, though Harrison has said that he in unsure whether the band is over. Though the 2013-2021 line ups are the longest running line-ups in the band's history, they never released any studio material, except "Fripp, Jakszyk & Collins' A Scarcity of Miracles" (featuring Fripp, Jakszyk, Collins, Levin and Harrison) and Jakko Jakszyk's "Secrets & Lies" (also featuring Fripp, Jakszyk, Collins, Levin and Harrison, and which most material was written during King Crimson writing sessions). The band was not musically active in 2022, with Fripp re-stating that the band is unlikely to tour again.

Members
Note: Release contributions do not include albums issued as part of the King Crimson Collector's Club, or other limited releases.

Final line-up

Former members

Touring musicians

Session contributors

Timeline
Small lines = ProjeKcts

Smaller line = Session Contribution

Line-ups

King Crimson

Spin-off bands

References

External links
Discipline Global Mobile official website

King Crimson